Mykhailo Mykolayovych Petrenko (1817 – January 6, 1863 [O. S. December 25, 1862]) was a Ukrainian romantic poet notable for his musical works, and a member of the Kharkiv Romantic School.

Biography 
Petrenko was born in the town Sloviansk to a family of petty officials in 1817. Petrenko studied at the juridical faculty of Kharkov University during 1837–1841. He served in the judicial institutions: in Kharkov (1844–1847), Vovchansk (1847–1849), Lebedyn (1849–1862), rising to collegiate assessor (rank 8th grade). 

Petrenko's first poetry published in the anthology Snip (1841). Among them was the poem "I looked at the sky and thought a thought", which became a folk song – the highest award for Ukrainian poet. His 1845 dramatic duma "Naida" was first published in 2013. In 1848 A. L. Metlynsky published in the "South Russian collection" selection of Petrenko's poems titled "Thoughts and singing". 

Asteroid 274843 Mykhailopetrenko, discovered by astronomers at the Andrushivka Astronomical Observatory in 2009, was named in his honor. The official  was published by the Minor Planet Center on 8 October 2014.

References

External links 

 Site dedicated to Mikhail Nikolayevich Petrenko

Ukrainian people in the Russian Empire
Ukrainian poets
Male writers from the Russian Empire
19th-century Ukrainian people
1817 births
1863 deaths
19th-century Ukrainian writers
19th-century Ukrainian poets
National University of Kharkiv alumni